Tube houses (Vietnamese: nhà ống) are a vernacular architectural form of shophouse endemic to Vietnam, characterized by their narrow width and multistory structure. Common throughout the country, tube houses have proliferated as a result of limited building space and property taxation policies assessing only the first floor width of homes. In Hanoi, tube houses originated at the end of the 19th century.

See also 

 Shophouse
 Row house

References 
Vernacular architecture
Buildings and structures in Asia
House types
Architectural design
Urban studies and planning terminology